Samselu (also Romanized as Samselū; also known as Samsūleh and Samsūlū) is a village in Shamil Rural District, Takht District, Bandar Abbas County, Hormozgan Province, Iran. At the 2006 census, its population was 356, in 70 families.

References 

Populated places in Bandar Abbas County